ISO/IEC 7811 Identification cards — Recording technique is a set of nine (7811-1 to 7811-9) standards describing the recording technique on identification cards.

It comprises:
 "Part 1": Embossing
 "Part 2": Magnetic stripe — Low coercivity
 "Part 3": Location of embossed characters on ID-1 cardsPart 3 is already withdrawn and revised by Part 1.
 "Part 4": Location of read-only magnetic tracks — Tracks 1 and 2Part 4 is already withdrawn and revised by Part 2.
 "Part 5": Location of read-write magnetic track — Track 3Part 5 is already withdrawn and revised by Part 2.
 "Part 6": Magnetic stripe — High coercivity
 "Part 7": Magnetic stripe — High coercivity, high densityAllows capacity 10 times that of a card conforming to Part 6.
 "Part 8": Magnetic stripe -- Coercivity of 51,7 kA/m (650 Oe)(including any protective overlay)
 "Part 9": Tactile identifier markSpecifies the physical characteristics of a tactile identifier mark used by visually impaired card holders to distinguish their cards.

External links 
 "ISO - International Organization for Standardization"

07811